Brita Johansson (born 16 September 1941) is a Finnish athlete. She competed in the women's long jump at the 1960 Summer Olympics.

References

External links
 

1941 births
Living people
Athletes (track and field) at the 1960 Summer Olympics
Finnish female long jumpers
Olympic athletes of Finland
People from Lapinjärvi
Sportspeople from Uusimaa